Vama may refer to:

 Vama, Satu Mare, a commune in Satu Mare County, Romania
 Vama, Suceava, a commune in Suceava County, Romania
 Vama, a village in Popeşti Commune, Iaşi County, Romania
 Vama, the Romanian name for Radhospivka village, Tsuren Commune, Hertsa Raion, Ukraine
 VAMA, ICAO code for Mundra Airport, India
 VAMA, the Vietnam Automobile Manufacturers' Association, see Automotive industry in Vietnam